The , subtitled My Seal Computer SV-100, is a 32-bit home video game console. Released exclusively in Japan in October 1995, it was unusual in that the marketing for it was completely targeted to female gamers.

The Loopy includes a built-in thermal color printer that can be used to create stickers from game screenshots. An optional accessory, called , is a video capture device to obtain images from VCRs and DVD players. Users may add text to these images and make stickers. Including Magical Shop's own built-in software, the Loopy library contains 10 games. The Loopy features one controller port for use with a standard game controller or with a mouse which was sold separately. Developer Kenji Terada worked on Loopy Town no Oheya ga Hoshii!.

Casio ceased production of the console in December 1998, with software development ending in November 1996.

Games

The games PC Collection and Lupiton's Wonder Palette were both packaged either as stand-alone or bundled with the mouse.

References

External links

Casio Loopy on UltimateConsoleDatabase.com
Casio Loopy on old-computers.com
Casio Loopy on playright.dk 
Casio Loopy on rfgeneration.com
FEMICOM Museum's Casio Loopy Collection
Video Game Kraken - Loopy

Home video game consoles
Fifth-generation video game consoles
Japan-only video game hardware
Loopy
Gender and video games
Products introduced in 1995
Women and the arts
Women and video games
SuperH-based game consoles